Lighthouse of Punta Candelaria is a lighthouse in Cedeira in the Province of A Coruña, Galicia, Spain. It was constructed between 1929 and 1933 and entered service in 1954.

See also

 List of lighthouses in Spain

References

External links
 Comisión de faros 

Lighthouses completed in 1933
Lighthouses in Galicia (Spain)
Buildings and structures in the Province of A Coruña